Sandile Msimango, popularly known by his stage name Young Stunna is a South African singer. He is known for his hit singles "Bopha" and "Adiwele". He has also extensively worked with record producers DJ Maphorisa and Kabza De Small.

Education
He attended Benoni West Primary and Lee Rand High School in Benoni. He completed his matric at Unity Secondary School in Daveyton.

Early life
Young Stunna was born in Daveyton, South Africa and grew up in a Christian family and often sang in the church choir. His mother was a vocalist and his father owned a tavern which had a jukebox. Spending time at the tavern on weekends exposed him to all types of genres, including RnB and Kwaito.

Career
He started making music at the age 13 and took the decision to pursue music as a career. He was initially a hip-hop musician from 2012 before switching to amapiano. He got the name Young Stunna from his fans in Daveyton where he grew up. He rose to fame earlier in 2021 as part of the piano hub roster-when he featured on Felo Le Tee and Mellow & Sleazy's smash amapiano hit, “Bopha”. 

In October 2021, he released his debut album, Notumato which features South African musicians DJ Maphorisa, Blxckie, Sizwe Alakaine, and Kabza De Small. His single "Adiwele" reached number 1 across SA radio with a total 23.4 million impressions.

Towards the end of April 2022, Stunna was featured  by  Spotify on Spotify documentary Freedom Sounds: From Kwaito to Amapiano.

Awards

BET Awards 

!
|-
|2022
|Himself 
|Best New International Act
|
|

Dstv Mzansi Viewer's Choice Awards 

!
|-
| 2022
| <div style="text-align: center;"> "Adiwele"
| Favourite Song of the Year 
| 
|

South African Music Awards 

!
|-
|2022
|Notumato
|Best Selling Artist 
|
|

Discography 
 Notumato (2021)

References

External links
 

Living people
Amapiano musicians
South African singer-songwriters
People from Gauteng
Year of birth missing (living people)